Malefic may refer to:

Malefic planet
Malefic (musician)
 Ma'alefa'ak, fictional supervillain of DC Comics